The Royal Scot was a named passenger express train that ran between London Euston and Glasgow Central on the West Coast Main Line (WCML), with previously a portion also going to Edinburgh.

History

Steam era

The timetabled service which eventually was known as the Royal Scot first ran in 1862. For many years it departed from both ends at 10:00 (mirroring the Flying Scotsman on the East Coast Main Line). From 1874, the train was hauled by LNWR Improved Precedent Class 2-4-0 locomotives. When 4-4-0 locos became available from 1897, the train was generally hauled by one of the fastest engines available. Early on this would normally be a LNWR Precursor Class 4-4-0, then from 1913 the LNWR Claughton Class 4-6-0, in each case with a change to Caledonian Railway locomotives at Carlisle Citadel and over Beattock Summit to Glasgow.

On 11 July 1927, the London Midland and Scottish Railway (LMS) relaunched the service under a new name, the Royal Scot. Initially the service was non-stop with an engine change at Carnforth, and the train divided at Symington with a portion continuing to Glasgow and the other portion to Edinburgh. All trains were hauled double headed; the Carnforth to Glasgow leg were hauled by two Midland 4-4-0 Compounds. In August 1927, the LMS introduced the modern and more powerful Royal Scot Class, a series of 4-6-0 locomotives that took over the service and ran from London Euston and Carlisle non-stop. This set a new British record for the longest non-stop run. At Carlisle, an engine of the same class based in Polmadie, Glasgow, would take over.

The Royal Scot train gradually became heavier, including the addition of dining coaches. In 1933, the Royal Scot was hauled by the Princess Royal Class, a group of 4-6-2 Pacifics and in 1937, by the new Coronation Class that featured a streamlined design. These engines sometimes worked the train with a brief stop at Carlisle for a change of crew.

In 1960 the down Royal Scot had its departure time from Euston changed to 09:05. The down train was speeded up by 40 minutes and the up train by 15 minutes, for a new journey time in both directions of 7 hours 15 minutes, identical with the other two daytime named trains of the era between London and Glasgow, The Caledonian and the Mid-Day Scot. All three trains at this period were restricted to eight coaches to save weight, and the number of passengers carried was limited to the seating capacity of the train, standing passengers not being permitted. All three trains ran non-stop between London and Carlisle.

Diesel and electric era
Diesel locomotives started to take over haulage of the train from the early 1960s.

By 1970 the London departure time of the Royal Scot had become 10:05, that from Glasgow 09:25, with a total journey time of 6 hours 35 minutes. It ran Monday to Saturday, and called only at Crewe and Carlisle.

Electrification to Glasgow took place in 1973–4, ending the locomotive change at Crewe and bringing the replacement of the early electric locomotives with the new British Rail Class 87s, titled Royal Scots by BR although better known as Electric Scots, in order to avoid clashing with the earlier steam locomotive class of that name.

The first stop out of Euston became Preston, for a crew change, and calls were now also made at Oxenholme and Carlisle. Traction became more mixed following the arrival of British Rail Class 90s in 1988.

The service lost its name in 2003 and there is now no equivalent special train.

See also
 Mid-Day Scot
 The Caledonian

References

Sources

Named passenger trains of the London, Midland and Scottish Railway
Named passenger trains of British Rail
Railway services introduced in 1927
1927 establishments in the United Kingdom